was a bureaucrat, politician and cabinet minister in the pre-war Empire of Japan.

Tawara was born in what is now part of the city of Hamada in Shimane Prefecture Japan. The Tawara family had been making soy sauce and candles in Hamada for generations. He graduated from the law department of Tokyo Imperial University in 1895, and became an official in the Home Ministry. He worked as an official in four different prefectural governments over the next eleven years. His first was Okinawa, where he was instrumental in writing laws on land reform and establishing a tax system, bringing the former Kingdom of the Ryukyus closer to legal assimilation with mainland Japan. In January 1906 he was transferred to a position in the newly created Regency General of Korea. Resident-General of Korea. In April he was assigned to oversee the Korean Education Ministry. In August 1907 he was named Vice-Minister of Education. He subsequently assisted in the first land survey of Korea under Japanese rule in 1910. After returning to Japan, he was appointed as Governor of Mie Prefecture (1912–1914), Governor of Miyazaki Prefecture (1914–1915), Governor of Hokkaido (1915–1919), and served as a senior official within the Ministry of Colonial Affairs.  Tawara was elected to the Lower House of the Diet of Japan in the 1924 General Election, under the Kenseikai banner. He later changed his political party affiliation to the Rikken Minseitō, and was reelected for six terms. He served as Secretary-General of the party in 1929.

In 1929, Prime Minister Osachi Hamaguchi picked Tawara as Minister of Commerce and Industry. After his term expired in April 1931, he continued to play an important role in the Diet and in the general administration of the Rikken Minseitō. As with all other Japanese politicians, Tawara was forced to join the Taisei Yokusankai created by Prime Minister Fumimaro Konoe in 1940. However, Tawara was defeated in the 1942 General Election and retired from public life. He died in 1944 at the age of 77.

References
Fletcher, William. Japanese Business Community and National Trade Policy, 1920-1942. University of North Carolina Press (1989). 
Samuels, Richard J. Rich Nation, Strong Army: National Security and the Technological Transformation of Japan, Cornell University Press (1996). 

1869 births
1944 deaths
People from Shimane Prefecture
University of Tokyo alumni
Government ministers of Japan
Imperial Rule Assistance Association politicians
Rikken Minseitō politicians
Members of the House of Representatives (Empire of Japan)
Directors of the Hokkaido Agency